Labriola v. Pollard Group, Inc., 152 Wash.2d 828 (2004), was a case decided by the Supreme Court of Washington that invalidated a modification of an employment contract for an at-will employee which would have added a non-competition agreement because the modification lacked independent consideration.

Anthony A. Labriola worked as a salesperson for the Pollard Group, a commercial print shop in Tacoma, Washington. The case serves as an example of when courts will strictly invoke the pre-existing duty rule in the interests of justice, in this case to protect an at-will employee.

References

External links
Full text of the opinion from Findlaw.com

United States contract case law
United States labor case law
2004 in United States case law
Washington (state) state case law
2004 in Washington (state)
Economy of Tacoma, Washington
Printing in the United States
Law articles needing an infobox